The 1980-81 NBA season was the Lakers' 33rd season in the NBA and the 21st season in Los Angeles. The Lakers were attempting to become the first team since 1969 to repeat as NBA Champions.  Despite missing Magic Johnson for 45 games due to a knee injury, the Lakers still managed an impressive 54-28 record during the regular season, and they were the #3 seed heading into the Western Conference playoffs.  However, the underdog Houston Rockets eliminated the Lakers in a best-of-three first round series two games to one.

NBA Draft
The Lakers did not have a first round pick in the 1980 Draft.  Their first selection was Wayne Robinson, the 31st pick overall, but he never played a game for the Lakers.  Future NBA Coach Butch Carter was their second selection at #37 overall.

Roster

Roster Notes
 Shooting guard Magic Johnson missed 45 games during the season after suffering a torn cartilage in his left knee on November 18 during a game against the Kansas City Kings.

Regular season

Season standings

Notes
 z, y – division champions
 x – clinched playoff spot

Record vs. opponents

Game log

Playoffs

|- align="center" bgcolor="#ffcccc"
| 1
| April 1
| Houston
| L 107–111
| Magic Johnson (26)
| Kareem Abdul-Jabbar (15)
| Norm Nixon (10)
| The Forum15,517
| 0–1
|- align="center" bgcolor="#ccffcc"
| 2
| April 3
| @ Houston
| W 111–106
| Kareem Abdul-Jabbar (27)
| Magic Johnson (18)
| Norm Nixon (11)
| The Summit16,121
| 1–1
|- align="center" bgcolor="#ffcccc"
| 3
| April 5
| Houston
| L 86–89
| Kareem Abdul-Jabbar (32)
| Kareem Abdul-Jabbar (18)
| Magic Johnson (9)
| The Forum14,813
| 1–2
|-

Player statistics
Note: GP= Games played; MPG= Minutes per Game; REB = Rebounds; AST = Assists; STL = Steals; BLK = Blocks; PTS = Points; PPG = Points per Game

Award winners/Honors
 Kareem Abdul-Jabbar, First Team All-NBA, First Team All-Defense, All-Star
 Michael Cooper, Second Team All-Defense
 Jamaal Wilkes, All-Star

Transactions

References

 Lakers on Database Basketball
 Lakers on Basketball Reference
 Lakers History @ NBA.com

Los Angeles Lakers seasons
Los
Los Angle
Los Angle